The Mirza Delibašić Hall (Serbo-Croatian:  / ), commonly known as Skenderija Hall, is an indoor sporting arena located in Sarajevo, Bosnia and Herzegovina, as a part of Skenderija.

Opened on 23 November 1969, the seating capacity of the arena is 5,616. It is currently home to the Bosna Royal Sarajevo basketball team and is named after its legendary player Mirza Delibašić.

Sports
Notable basketball events hosted at the arena include the preliminary rounds of the 1970 FIBA World Championship, the 1970 FIBA European Champions Cup final in which Ignis Varese defeated CSKA Moscow 79-74 and the 1980 Intercontinental Cup tournament in which Maccabi Tel Aviv won the title.

Concerts

See also
 List of indoor arenas in Bosnia and Herzegovina

References

External links

Official site
Facebook page

Indoor arenas in Bosnia and Herzegovina
Sports venues in Sarajevo
Basketball venues in Bosnia and Herzegovina
Handball venues in Bosnia and Herzegovina
KK Bosna Royal